Himatolabus is a genus of leaf-rolling weevils in the beetle family Attelabidae. There are about 16 described species in Himatolabus.

Species
These 16 species belong to the genus Himatolabus:

 Himatolabus axillaris (Gyllenhal, 1839)
 Himatolabus burleyi Hamilton
 Himatolabus chujoi Kôno, 1939
 Himatolabus coloradoensis Voss, 1925
 Himatolabus cupreus Voss, 1925
 Himatolabus maculatus Voss, 1929
 Himatolabus nudus Hamilton
 Himatolabus pubescens (Say, 1826)
 Himatolabus rhois Voss, 1925
 Himatolabus rudis Voss, 1925
 Himatolabus subpilosus Voss, 1925
 Himatolabus umbosis Hamilton
 Himatolabus vestitus Voss, 1925
 Himatolabus vinosus Voss, 1925
 Himatolabus viometallicus Hamilton
 Himatolabus vogti Hamilton

References

Further reading

 
 

Attelabidae
Articles created by Qbugbot